Daniel Matthew Langhi (born November 28, 1977) is an American former professional basketball player. Born in Chicago, Illinois, he was raised in the small western Kentucky town of Benton. In addition to his high school basketball career, where he finish as the runner-up for Kentucky's prestigious "Mr. Basketball" award, Langhi won regional titles as a member of Marshall County's soccer teams. After growing six inches during his sophomore year of high school, he joined is other brother Bob Langhi in playing college basketball, signing to play college basketball at Vanderbilt, and was drafted 31st overall by the Dallas Mavericks in the second round of the 2000 NBA Draft. Langhi played for the Houston Rockets, the Phoenix Suns, the Golden State Warriors and the Milwaukee Bucks in the NBA.

While at Vanderbilt, Langhi was a three-year starter for the Commodores at small forward, creating mismatches with his 6'11" frame. After finishing his junior year as the second leading scorer in the Southeastern Conference at 17.7 points per game, Langhi paced the league his senior year with a 22.1 point average, and averaged 6.0 rebounds. He became the first Vanderbilt player to lead the SEC in scoring since 1965. Langhi was voted SEC player of the year along with LSU's Stromile Swift, becoming the first Commodore since Billy McCaffrey in 1993 to be named the league's top player. During the 1999–2000 season, Langhi scored 20 plus points in 19 of 29 games, and was also named the league's First Team, the second year in a row that he made an All-SEC team.

Langhi finished his college career with 1,502 points, which currently ranks 10th all-time at Vanderbilt. Langhi ranks seventh all-time in 3-point field goals made at Vanderbilt with 138. He capped his senior season by being selected to compete for the National 3-Point Shooting Title, and was one of 22 finalists for the Wooden Award.

Langhi played in the NBA from 2000 to 2004, playing 133 games and averaging 3 points and 1.5 rebounds. Langhi's final NBA game was played on December 17th, 2003 in a 83 - 93 loss to the Los Angeles Clippers where he recorded 2 points and 1 rebound. After the NBA, Langhi played in the CBA, Italy, Japan, Germany, and Puerto Rico. In 2010, he signed with Libertad de Sunchales in the Argentine Liga Nacional de Básquet.

NBA career statistics

Regular season

|-
| align="left" | 2000–01
| align="left" | Houston
| 33 || 0 || 7.3 || .374 || .000 || .552 || 1.2 || 0.1 || 0.2 || 0.0 || 2.7
|-
| align="left" | 2001–02
| align="left" | Houston
| 34 || 8 || 12.8 || .392 || .250 || .727 || 2.0 || 0.4 || 0.2 || 0.1 || 3.1
|-
| align="left" | 2002–03
| align="left" | Phoenix
| 60 || 0 || 9.0 || .401 || .290 || .600 || 1.5 || 0.4 || 0.3 || 0.1 || 3.1
|-
| align="left" | 2003–04
| align="left" | Golden State
| 4 || 0 || 4.3 || .333 || .000 || 1.000 || 0.8 || 0.0 || 0.0 || 0.0 || 1.5
|-
| align="left" | 2003–04
| align="left" | Milwaukee
| 2 || 0 || 10.0 || .375 || .500 || .000 || 0.5 || 0.0 || 0.0 || 0.0 || 3.5
|- class="sortbottom"
| style="text-align:center;" colspan="2"| Career
| 133 || 8 || 9.4 || .391 || .289 || .613 || 1.5 || 0.3 || 0.2 || 0.1 || 3.0
|}

External links
NBA.com Profile
Player Stats

1977 births
Living people
American expatriate basketball people in Argentina
American expatriate basketball people in Germany
American expatriate basketball people in Italy
American expatriate basketball people in Japan
American men's basketball players
Dallas Mavericks draft picks
Golden State Warriors players
Houston Rockets players
Idaho Stampede (CBA) players
Libertad de Sunchales basketball players
Milwaukee Bucks players
People from Benton, Kentucky
Phoenix Suns players
San-en NeoPhoenix players
Small forwards
Vanderbilt Commodores men's basketball players
Basketball players from Chicago